Daria Bignardi (born Ferrara, 14 February 1961) is an Italian journalist, novelist, and television presenter. She was the recipient of the Rapallo Carige Prize for Non vi lascerò orfani in 2009.

References

Italian women novelists
21st-century Italian women writers
21st-century Italian novelists
Italian women journalists
Italian television journalists
Women television journalists
20th-century Italian journalists
21st-century Italian journalists
People from Ferrara
1961 births
Living people
20th-century Italian women